Lucien Dodge (born June 24, 1984) is an American voice actor who does work in animation, anime and video games. He is mostly known for his characters in anime such as Waver Velvet in Fate/Zero, Maron and Chili in Pokémon, K1-B0 in Danganronpa V3: Killing Harmony, Takumu Mayuzumi in Accel World, the title character of the video game Dust: An Elysian Tail, Mahito in Jujutsu Kaisen, Metphies in Godzilla: Planet of the Monsters, Godzilla: City on the Edge of Battle, and Godzilla: The Planet Eater, and Akaza in Demon Slayer. He has also read for audio books for Live Oak Media. Dodge has appeared on voice acting panels at T-Mode, Otakon, and NohCon, has been a special guest teacher at NYU, and had appeared at the National Audio Theater Festival for six consecutive years. He lives in Los Angeles, California, in an apartment with his partner, Erica Mendez. They have been together for about twelve years as of 2022. He has been heard in commercials endorsing products such as Pop Tarts, Minute Maid, Verizon Wireless, Kellogg's and Chevrolet.

Filmography

Anime
 Accel World – Takumu Mayuzumi (Cyan Pile)
 Aggretsuko – Additional Voices
 Ajin: Demi-Human – Masumi Okuyama
 Aldnoah.Zero – Yutaro Tsumugi
 The Asterisk War - Shuma Sakon
 B-Daman CrossFire – Takakura
 Bleach – Yukio Hans Vorarlberna
 Blood Lad – Akim Papradon
 Boruto: Naruto Next Generations – Sekiei
 Carole & Tuesday – Spencer
 Cells at Work! – Neutrophil U-2626
 Charlotte - Jojiro Takajo
Demon Slayer: Kimetsu no Yaiba - Akaza
 Fate/stay night: Unlimited Blade Works – Lord El-Melloi II (Ep. 25)
 Fate/Zero – Waver Velvet
 God Eater - Kota Fujiki
 Gosick – Ambrose
 Glitter Force - Jared, Cop
 Hi Score Girl – Kotaro Miyao, Koharu's Father, Guile
 Hunter × Hunter 2011 series – Katzo (Ep. 1), Man A (ep2), Matthew (ep2), Imori, Sedokan
 ID-0 - Elder Urakuo Hakubi, Commander 
 JoJo's Bizarre Adventure: Diamond Is Unbreakable - Toshikazu Hazamada
 Jujutsu Kaisen - Mahito
 K – Adolf K. Weismann (Silver King), Tatara Totsuka, Masaomi Dewa
 Kill la Kill – Jiro Suzaku (Ep. 14), Kenta Sakuramiya (Ep. 14), Additional Voices
 Kuroko's Basketball - Kōichi Kawahara
 Inazuma Eleven Ares - Heath Moore, Valentin Eisner
 Little Witch Academia - Andrew Hanbridge
 Magi: The Labyrinth of Magic – Ja'far
 Mobile Suit Gundam: Iron-Blooded Orphans - Norba Shino
 Mobile Suit Gundam SEED - Sai Argyle (NYAV Post dub)
 Mobile Suit Gundam: The Origin - Amuro Ray
 Naruto Shippuden – Additional Voices
 Odd Taxi – Eiji Kakihana
 Pokémon – Chili, Maron, Thomas 
 Pokémon Origins – Blue
 Sailor Moon – Zoisite, Motoki Furuhata (Viz dub)
 Sailor Moon Crystal – Zoisite, Motoki Furuhata
 The Seven Deadly Sins – Simon
 Sword Art Online – Keita (Ep. 3)
 Talentless Nana – Rentarō Tsurumigawa
 Tiger & Bunny – Isaac, Kotetsu T. Kaburagi (Young), Additional Voices
 Tokyo Revengers – Keisuke Baji

Animation
 The Backwater Gospel – Minister, Fearful Townsperson
 Hanazuki: Full of Treasures – Junior
 Heaven Official's Blessing – Fu Yao (English version)
 Screechers Wild - Xander
 Space Chickens in Space - Finley
 Speed of Magic – Nello
 Stitch & Ai – Qian Dahu, Wendy Pleakley
 Surface – Nathaniel Jenson
 Tree Fu Tom – Tom (American version)
 True Tail: School of Heroes – Caleb the cat
 XIN – Kiz
 YooHoo to the Rescue – Roodee

Films
 Batman Unlimited: Mechs vs. Mutants – Damian Wayne/Robin
 Demon Slayer: Kimetsu no Yaiba the Movie: Mugen Train – Akaza
 Naruto Shippuden the Movie: The Lost Tower – Sarai
 Godzilla: Planet of the Monsters – Metphies
 Godzilla: City on the Edge of Battle - Metphies
 Godzilla: The Planet Eater - Metphies

Video games
 Aquaria – The Creator
 Backstage Pass – Lloyd Newton
 Bravely Default – Victor S. Court
 Code Vein - Male player character voice 1
 Cookie Run: Kingdom – Clover Cookie
 Dance Central 2 – Kerith
 Dance Central 3 – Kerith
 Danganronpa: Trigger Happy Havoc – Hifumi Yamada
 Danganronpa V3: Killing Harmony – K1-B0
 Demon Slayer: Kimetsu no Yaiba – The Hinokami Chronicles – Kazumi, Akaza
 Diablo III: Reaper of Souls – Monster Voice Effects
 Dies Irae: Phantatiom Elements – Claude Alexandros Belthasar III
 Disney Infinity – Additional voices
 Dust: An Elysian Tail – Dust, Jin, Cassius 
 Dynasty Warriors 8 – Li Dian
 Fallout 76: Wastelanders – Aries, AshTrey, Registration Guard, Roper
 Fire Emblem Echoes: Shadows of Valentia - Leon
 Fire Emblem Heroes - Leon, Naesala
 Fire Emblem: Three Houses - Felix
 Fire Emblem Warriors: Three Hopes – Felix
 Food Fantasy - Zongzi, Raindrop Cake, Cassata, Popcorn
 Guilty Gear Xrd – Sin Kiske
 Guilty Gear Strive – Sin Kiske
 Heileen 2: The Hands of Fate – Black, Morgan, Otto
 Heroes of Newerth – Cupid, Grinex the Riftstalker, Tetra
 Inazuma Eleven – Jude Sharp, Steve Grim, Sam Kincaid, Byron Love
 League of Legends – Mega Gnar
 Mad Max – Buzzard, Additional voices
 MapleStory – Male Xenon
 MapleStory 2 – Male Wizard
Master Detective Archives: Rain Code as Yuma Kokohead
 Monster Hunter Rise - Hojo
 Octopath Traveler - Additional voices
 Pac-Man and the Ghostly Adventures – Blinky, Skeebo
 Paladins – Pip, Lex (L-Exo Suit Skin)
 Re:Zero − Starting Life in Another World: The Prophecy of the Throne - Rachins
 Sequence – Caleb
 Shining Resonance Refrain – Jinas Aion
 Skylanders: Giants – Stadium voices
 Skylanders: Swap Force – Stadium voices
 Story of Seasons: Pioneers of Olive Town – Additional voices
 SMITE – Sylvanus (Dr. Vanus skin)
 Soulcalibur VI - Additional voices
 The Legend of Heroes: Trails of Cold Steel – Elliot Craig
 The Legend of Heroes: Trails of Cold Steel II – Elliot Craig 
 The Legend of Heroes: Trails of Cold Steel IV – Elliot Craig
 The Legend of Heroes: Trails into Reverie – Elliot Craig
 Valkyria Chronicles IV - Forseti
 Valkyria Revolution – Gustav Mechlenburg
 World of Warcraft: Warlords of Draenor – Young Durotan, Additional voices

Live-action dubbing
 Violetta – Tomas, Napoleon (singing voice) (English dub)

Notes

References

External links
 
 
 

Living people
American male voice actors
American male video game actors
21st-century American male actors
1984 births
Place of birth missing (living people)